Cristina Gonçalves (born 15 September 1977) is a Portuguese boccia player who has cerebral palsy, She  has competed for her country and won medals at several Summer Paralympics.

Career
Cristina Gonçalves was born on 15 September 1977 in Lisbon, Portugal. When she was 11 months old, she contracted meningitis resulting in cerebral palsy. She began competing nationally in boccia in 1998, having taken up the sport at the age of 14. She is classified as BC2. Gonçalves' first overall victory came in 2003 in the boccia World Cup in New Zealand.

She attended her first Summer Paralympics in 2004 in Athens, Greece, where she won a gold medal as part of the team BC1-2 competition with a victory over New Zealand. She continued to compete at successive Paralympic Games, where she won a silver medal in the team event at the 2008 Summer Paralympics in Beijing, China, but failed to win a medal at the 2012 Games in London, England.

At the 2016 Summer Paralympics, she was the only female player on the mixed boccia team. They qualified out of the group stage following a loss to Argentina followed by victories over Slovakia and Brazil. They were beaten 8-5 by Japan in the semi-final, resulting in a rematch against Argentina in the bronze medal match. Despite the earlier 1–7 loss, they defeated Argentina 6–2 to win the bronze medal.

References

Living people
1977 births
People from Lisbon
People with cerebral palsy
Paralympic athletes of Portugal
Boccia players at the 2004 Summer Paralympics
Boccia players at the 2008 Summer Paralympics
Boccia players at the 2012 Summer Paralympics
Boccia players at the 2016 Summer Paralympics
Paralympic gold medalists for Portugal
Paralympic silver medalists for Portugal
Paralympic bronze medalists for Portugal
Paralympic medalists in boccia
Medalists at the 2004 Summer Paralympics
Medalists at the 2008 Summer Paralympics
Medalists at the 2016 Summer Paralympics